McVie is a surname. Notable people with the surname include:

Brad McVie, a character in the movie Four Christmases
Christine McVie (1943–2022), English musician
Gordon McVie (1945–2021), British medical doctor
John McVie (born 1945), English rock bass guitarist
Tom McVie (born 1935), Canadian ice hockey coach
Willie McVie (born 1948), Scottish footballer
Sarah McVie (born 1978), Canadian actress

See also
McVee, surname